Delavigne is a surname. Notable people with the surname include:

 Germain Delavigne (1790–1868),  dramatist and librettist
 Casimir Delavigne (1793–1843), poet, dramatist and librettist

See also 
 Delevingne
 Lavine
 Levine
 Levinger

French-language surnames
Surnames of French origin